PT Pakuwon Jati Tbk is an Indonesian real estate developer based in Surabaya and the holding company of the Pakuwon Group. Pakuwon was founded by Alexander Tedja in 1982 and focuses on the construction of shopping centers and office buildings in Surabaya and Jakarta. Pakuwon Jati embodies the superblock concept in Indonesia, a large-scale integrated development in malls, offices, condominiums and hotels. Pakuwon owns and manages shopping centers such as Tunjungan Plaza superblocks, BBD Tower complex office, five-stars Sheraton Surabaya Hotel, Condominium and Laguna Indah real estate, as well as several industrial estates located in Surabaya metropolitan area. On August 22, 1989, Pakuwon obtained an effective statement from Bapepam-LK (now the Financial Services Authority - OJK) to conduct an initial public offering (IPO). These shares were listed on the Surabaya Stock Exchange and the Jakarta Stock Exchange on October 9, 1989.

List real estates owned and operated by Pakuwon

Superblocks 
 Tunjungan Plaza
 Pakuwon Mall
 Pakuwon City Mall
 Food Junction Pakuwon
 Royal Plaza
 Kota Kasablanka, Jakarta
 Gandaria City, Jakarta
 Blok M Plaza, Jakarta

Apartments 
 Condominium Regency - Tunjungan Plaza 3
 The Peak Residence - Tunjungan Plaza 5
 One Icon Residence - Tunjungan Plaza 6
 Waterplace Residence - Pakuwon Mall Superblock
 Orchard & Tanglin Apartment - Pakuwon Mall Superblock
 La Riz Condominium - Pakuwon Mall Superblock
 Anderson & Benson Tower - Pakuwon Mall Superblock
 La Viz Condominium - Pakuwon Mall Superblock
 Educity - Pakuwon City

Skyscrapers 
 Mandiri Tower, Surabaya
 The Peak Residence, Tunjungan superblocks
 Pakuwon Tower (Headquarters of Pakuwon Group)

References

External links 

 Official website of Pakuwon Jati
 Official website of Pakuwon Group

1982 establishments in Indonesia
1980s initial public offerings
Companies based in Surabaya
Companies listed on the Indonesia Stock Exchange
Construction and civil engineering companies established in 1982
Indonesian companies established in 1982
Indonesian brands
Construction and civil engineering companies of Indonesia